Lathrop High School may refer to:

Lathrop High School (Alaska)
Lathrop High School (California)